The 1991 Rhode Island Rams football team was an American football team that represented the University of Rhode Island in the Yankee Conference during the 1991 NCAA Division I-AA football season. In their 16th season under head coach Bob Griffin, the Rams compiled a 6–5 record (3–5 against conference opponents) and tied for fourth place out of nine teams in the conference.

Schedule

References

Rhode Island
Rhode Island Rams football seasons
Rhode Island Rams football